Qaraqan Şıxlar (also, Qarağan Şıxlar and Karagan-Shykhlar) is a village and municipality in the Agdash Rayon of Azerbaijan.  It has a population of 1,892. The municipality consists of the villages of Qaraqan Şıxlar and Qaraqan Sədi.

References 

Populated places in Agdash District